The 1937–38 United States collegiate men's ice hockey season was the 44th season of collegiate ice hockey in the United States.

Regular season

Standings

References

1937–38 NCAA Standings

External links
College Hockey Historical Archives

 
College